Wizard's Challenge is an adventure for the 2nd edition of the Advanced Dungeons & Dragons fantasy role-playing game, published in 1992.

Plot summary
The module is designed for individual low-level mages or parties of up to three characters. It centers on the village of Northbank, a previously busy town with a current minor connection to nearby wizards. "Haunting visitations" and murder begin the adventure which focuses on roleplaying and problem-solving vs. combat.

Publication history
The module was published by TSR and written by Tim Beach.

Reception
Keith H. Eisenbeis reviewed Wizard's Challenge in the March–April 1993 issue of White Wolf Magazine. He described it as an "excellent module that forms a great start for any mage [player character]", and stated that it was "well worth the price". Eisenbeis rated it an overall 4 out of a possible 5.

References

Dungeons & Dragons modules
Role-playing game supplements introduced in 1992